A Ling is a village in southeastern Laos. It is in Kaleum District in Sekong Province.

Populated places in Sekong Province